This is a list of Greater Wellington Regional Council contracted bus routes in the Wellington Region, operated under the banner of the Metlink public transport network, as well as commercially operated commuter services. There are approximately 100 bus routes in total across the region.

Route numbers 
Route numbers are generally classified by area: routes 1-29 are Wellington City routes, 30-39 are express and peak-only routes, 50-59 and 60 are Newlands routes, 80-99 are commercial routes, 110-119 are Upper Hutt City routes, 120-199 are Lower Hutt City routes, 200-209 are Wairarapa routes, 220-239 are Porirua City routes, 250-299 are Kapiti Coast routes, and 300-999 are school bus routes or other special routes.

From July 2018, many Wellington City routes were shortened to connect with high-frequency spine routes at bus hubs, but extend to the city centre at peak times. For example, the usual route 19 service in Johnsonville connects with the route 1 service during the day, but extends to Wellington City in the peak time as route 19e. These extended routes sometimes differ from other peak-only routes by running in both directions at peak (although some do only run in one direction). An 'x' suffix generally means that the service is an express service and does not stop at all the bus stops along the route.

Prior to 2018, routes 40-49 were used for routes in Wellington City's north-western suburbs, and prior to 2011 Porirua City routes were numbered from 60-69 and Kapiti Coast routes from 70-79. Other services, like the railway lines, cable car, and harbour ferry, are given lettered route numbers (for example, the Melling Line is MEL).

Route operators 
Under the new Public Transport Operating Model, all Wellington Region bus routes were put out to tender in 2016. All tendered routes in Wellington City were awarded to Tranzit Group, and all direct appointment routes in Wellington City and Eastbourne remain with NZ Bus and Newlands Coach Services. Uzabus won all tendered routes on the Kapiti Coast, and Tranzit Group (under the brand Tranzurban) won all tendered routes in the Hutt Valley and Porirua and remained the bus operator in the Wairarapa.

List of routes

Wellington City routes from 2018
These bus routes, which came into operation on 15 July 2018, operate within the Wellington City area. Previously, Wellington City services (with the exception of Newlands and Johnsonville services) were operated entirely by GO Wellington.

Commercially operated routes
A number of commercial routes (mainly commuter services) are operated between the Hutt Valley and other parts of the region. The bus routes are not run as part of the Regional Council network and do not follow the Metlink fare structure, but timetables are branded Metlink. The Hutt Valley-Wellington commuter services will be reviewed in late 2018, after NZ Bus lost the Hutt Valley contracts in June. Most have been taken over by NZ Coach Services in the meantime.

Hutt Valley routes
These Hutt Valley routes first came into service on 15 July, 2018. Previously, Hutt Valley services were operated entirely by Valley Flyer.

Wairarapa routes
The Wairarapa is physically separated from Wellington by the Remutaka Range. Connections to Wellington are made by the Wairarapa Connection train from Masterton to Wellington.

Porirua routes
Most Porirua services connect with the Kapiti Line railway service at Porirua station. The route 60 service connects Wellington City and Porirua City bus services by road (see the Wellington City section). Previously, Porirua services were operated entirely by Mana Coach Services.

Kapiti Coast routes
Kapiti Coast services are separated from the other urban areas. Paraparaumu services usually terminate at Paraparaumu station, connecting with Kapiti Line trains, and travel via Coastlands Shopping Centre. Waikanae and Ōtaki services leave from Waikanae station, connecting with Kapiti Line trains there. Previously, Kapiti Coast services (apart from Ōtaki services) were operated entirely by Mana Coach Services.

After Midnight routes
Night services run on Saturday and Sunday mornings, outside normal bus hours. Route numbers are prefixed with the letter N, and route names are prefixed with "After Midnight".

All services are one-way going out of central Wellington, except N8 which runs one-way from Lower Hutt to Wellington

External links
Metlink website
Snapper - Travel Passes on Snapper
Wellington CitySights

References

Wellington
Public transport in the Wellington Region
New Zealand transport-related lists